Pomacea haustrum, common name the titan applesnail, is a species of large freshwater snail with an operculum, an aquatic gastropod mollusk in the family Ampullariidae, the applesnails.

Original description 
Pomacea haustrum was originally described under the name Ampullaria haustrum by Lovell Augustus Reeve in his book Conchologia Iconica, in 1856.

In Reeve's original text, (the type description) reads as follows:

It is difficult to identify even the general region of the type locality for this species. The type locality was given as the Río Marañón, Brazil, but this river is in Peru, joining with the Rio Ucayali above Iquitos to become the Rio Solimões, which in turn joins with the Rio Negro to become the Amazon River of Brazil. Some of the first Europeans to explore the region in the sixteenth century, however, referred to the Amazon River as El Río Marañón, and some nineteenth century maps refer to the entire Amazon as the Marañón. It is likely that the Río Marañón of one collector was not the same as the Río Marañón of another.

It was considered a synonym of Pomacea canaliculata by Thompson (1997)<ref>Thompson F. G. (1997). "Pomacea canaliculata (Lamarck 1822) (Gastropoda, Prosobranchia, Pilidae): a freshwater snail introduced into Florida, USA". Malac. Rev. 30: 91.</ref> based on shell morphology, but tentatively retained as a separate species by Cowie & Thiengo, because of its reported production of green eggs. Phylogenetic analyses by Rawlings et al. (2007) confirmed its species status.

 Shell description Pomacea haustrum is a large species that has a large globular shell with a channeled suture.

 Distribution 
The indigenous distribution of Pomacea haustrum is Bolivia, Brazil and Peru in South America.

The nonindigenous distribution includes the United States: Loxahatchee National Wildlife Refuge waters in Palm Beach County, Florida. Pomacea haustrum were discovered in the late 1970s in Palm Beach County Florida, and have not spread appreciably in 30 years. This is the only known area where this species is established in the United States. The initial introduction in the United States was probably from aquarium release, aka "aquarium dumping". Pomacea haustrum is currently of relatively minor concern in the U.S., given its failure to spread beyond Palm Beach County after 30 years or more in Florida. However, many species have maintained limited distributions, sometimes for decades, before becoming invasive.

 Ecology 

 Habitat 
This species lives in freshwater rivers.

 Life cycle 
Populations of Pomacea haustrum in Florida produce bright green egg masses consisting of individual eggs approximately 3–5 mm in size compressed into polygonal shapes, giving the egg mass an irregular honeycombed appearance. Since other Pomacea species also produce green eggs, this character is insufficient to verify this species as Pomacea haustrum''. It lays its eggs in clutches above the water level.

References 
This article incorporates a public domain work of the United States Government from the reference  and CC-BY-2.0 text from the reference.

Further reading 

 
 Ghesquiere S. Pomacea (Pomacea) haustrum. The Apple Snail (Ampullariidae) Website http://www.applesnail.net
Applesnails of Florida on the UF / IFAS Featured Creatures Web site

haustrum
Gastropods described in 1856